Touch is the first studio album by Japanese musical group NEWS, released on April 27, 2005. The album reached the number one position on the Oricon Daily Album Chart and Oricon Weekly Album Chart. Four singles have been released from this album.

Tie-ups and theme songs
"Kibou ~Yell~" was used as the 2004 FIVB Men's World Olympic Qualification Tournaments theme song for Japanese television broadcasting. "Kirameki no Kanata e" was used as the image song for the 36th Spring High School Volleyball tournament, as well as the Nivea "8x4 Powder Spray" commercial song. "Akaku Moyuru Taiyou" was used as the image song for the 2004 Japanese Fuji Television broadcast of the FIVB World Grand Prix. "Cherish" was used as the TBC "Good News" Campaign Song. "NEWS Nippon" was used as the 2003 Volleyball World Cup Japanese broadcast song.

Track listing

DVD

A DVD came with the limited edition version of the album. It contained a "PRIVATE MOVIE" section of the members pretending to go on dates with viewers, "CONCERT" section with a performance of "Yume no Kazu dake Ai ga Umareru" from the NEWSnowConcert, and a "MESSAGE" section with a brief message about the album from each member.

External links
 Review of the album from CDJournal

2005 albums
News (band) albums